"Suddenly" is a popular song from 1985 co-written and performed by UK-based singer Billy Ocean. Co-written and produced by Keith Diamond, it is the title track to Ocean's 1984 breakthrough album.

Released as the third single from the album (following the success of "Caribbean Queen" and "Loverboy"), the ballad became the album's most successful single in the UK, reaching number four on the UK Singles Chart in mid-1985. The song also reached the same chart peak on the Billboard Hot 100 chart in the US, spending two weeks at number four in June of that year. It peaked at number five on the Billboard R&B chart and spent two weeks at number one on the Billboard adult contemporary chart.

Music video
The music video features Billy Ocean appearing to perform the song live before an audience.

Charts

Weekly charts

Year-end charts

See also
List of number-one adult contemporary singles of 1985 (U.S.)

References

1985 singles
Billy Ocean songs
Soul ballads
Songs written by Billy Ocean
1984 songs
1980s ballads
Songs written by Keith Diamond (songwriter)
Jive Records singles